Sava Antić (Serbian Cyrillic: Сава Антић; 1 March 1930 – 26 July 1998) was a Serbian football player and manager.

Biography
He won the Yugoslav Cup 3 times, in 1953, 1955, and 1962, being the scorer in all the 3 cup finals. He started his career as a football player in FK Brodarac. In 1948 he moved to Red Star where he played 36 games and scored 22 goals. The highlight of his playing career started in 1950, when he decided to wear the Blue-White jersey of OFK Beograd where he played until 1963. During that period, he played 520 games and scored 184 goals in official matches. In his entire career he has never been sent off.

Antić played for the youth national team from 1953 to 1956, scoring 7 times in 9 matches. He was later a member of the B national team for which he scored 6 goals in 10 games. As far as the A national team is concerned, he played 5 matches, all of them in 1956, and scored two goals. He was also a member of the Olympic national team, during the Olympic Games in Melbourne, where Yugoslavia won the silver medal. He was one of the best forwards at that period, but was unfortunate to play in the glory days of Rajko Mitić, the legend of Red Star and Yugoslav football. For this reason, he was not given a real chance in the national team. After his career as a player, he became a coach in OFK Belgrade.

Sava died in 1998.

References

External links
 

1930 births
1998 deaths
Yugoslav footballers
Yugoslavia international footballers
Serbian footballers
Yugoslav First League players
Red Star Belgrade footballers
OFK Beograd players
Olympic footballers of Yugoslavia
Olympic silver medalists for Yugoslavia
Footballers at the 1956 Summer Olympics
Association football forwards
Footballers from Belgrade
Yugoslav football managers
Serbian football managers
OFK Beograd managers
Olympic medalists in football
Medalists at the 1956 Summer Olympics